Martonoš is a village located in the Kanjiža municipality, in the North Banat District of Serbia. It is situated in the Autonomous Province of Vojvodina. The village has a Hungarian ethnic majority (86.89%) and its population numbering 2,183 people (2002 census).

Historical population
1961: 3,400
1971: 2,996
1981: 2,737
1991: 2,423

See also
List of places in Serbia
List of cities, towns and villages in Vojvodina

Sister cities
Martonos is twinned with:
  Gátér, Hungary
  Martfű, Hungary
  Algyő, Hungary
  Újvár, Romania

References
Slobodan Ćurčić, Broj stanovnika Vojvodine, Novi Sad, 1996.

External links 

History of Martonoš (Hungarian)

Places in Bačka
Populated places in Serbia